Lione Pascoli (1674 in Perugia – 1744 in Rome) was an Italian abbot, art historian, collector, and economist.

At 16 years of age, he moved to Rome. He wrote biographies of contemporary artists and those of Perugia. The former, published in Rome in 1730, is a source of importance for the lives and output of late-baroque artists of Italy.

In economic theory, Lione promulgated a mix of protectionism and mercantilism, proposing the abolition of internal tariffs on agricultural products, and ban on the export of raw commodities and importationation of manufactured goods. Lione was influenced by French economists such as Pierre Le Pesant. His work influenced later reforms implemented by Pope Pius VI and the Grand-Duke of Tuscany, Peter Leopold.

He also was an avid collector of art, amassing a large collection of works, mostly in the categories of still lives, battle paintings, and also genre pictures by members of the Bambocciate.  After his death, his heirs dispersed many of the works. About forty paintings form part of the collection of the Municipal Art Gallery of the town of Deruta, Italy.

Writings

Perugian Artists Featured in Pascoli's Vite

Artists Featured in Pascoli's Vite Moderni

Sources

1674 births
1744 deaths
People from Perugia
Italian art collectors
Italian art historians
Italian economists